The Estonian Cup, also known as the Paf SuperCup for sponsorship reasons, is an annual cup competition for Estonian basketball teams. It is organized by the Estonian Basketball Association.

Until the 2000–01 season, the cup tournament was held in the end of the season in spring. In 2001, the tournament was moved to the first half of the season, and two Estonian Basketball Cup tournaments were held within the same calendar year.

Winners

 1946: Kalev
 1947: Not held
 1948: Kalev
 1949: Not held
 1950: Tartu ÜSK
 1951: Not held
 1952: Tartu ÜSK
 1953–1955: Not held
 1956: TRÜ
 1957: EPA
 1958: TRÜ
 1959: EPA
 1960: TPI
 1961: TPI
 1962: TPI
 1963: EPA
 1964: TPI

 1965: EPA
 1966: TPI
 1967: TPI
 1968: Kalev
 1969: Kalev
 1970: TPI
 1971: Keskrajoon
 1972: Kalev
 1973: EKE Projekt
 1974: TRÜ
 1975: Not held
 1976: TRÜ
 1977–1978: Not held
 1979: TRÜ
 1980: Standard
 1981: Standard
 1982: Metallist

 1983–1987: Not held
 1988: Harju KEK
 1989: Harju KEK
 1990–1991: Not held
 1992: Kalev
 1993: Kalev/Rafter
 1994–1995: Not held
 1996: Kalev
 1997: Not held
 1998: Nybit
 1999: Tallinn
 2000: Tartu Ülikool Delta
 2001: Tartu Ülikool Delta
 2001: Kalev
 2002: Tartu Ülikool Rock
 2003: TTÜ/A. Le Coq
 2004: Tartu Ülikool Rock

 2005: Kalev Cramo
 2006: Kalev Cramo
 2007: Kalev Cramo
 2008: Kalev Cramo
 2009: Tartu Ülikool Rock
 2010: Tartu Ülikool Rock
 2011: Tartu Ülikool Rock
 2012: Rakvere Tarvas
 2013: Tartu Ülikool Rock
 2014: Tartu Ülikool Rock
 2015: Kalev Cramo
 2016: Kalev Cramo
 2017–2019: Not held
 2020: Kalev Cramo
 2021: Tartu Ülikool
 2022: Kalev Cramo

Finals

Titles by team

Winning rosters

1998–99 Tallinn

Vjatšeslav Botškarjov, Arko Kask, Erki Kivinukk, Aivar Kuusmaa, Mait Käbin, Olev-Illimar Luiga, Margus Metstak, Indrek Rumma, Indrek Ruut, Kauri Sild, Meelis Songe, Raoul Suurorg, Tair Tenno, Rivo Turro, Reemo Veski (Coach: Üllar Kerde)

1999–00 Tartu Ülikool-Delta

Marek Doronin, Tanel Kaljula, Toomas Kandimaa, Tarmo Kikerpill, Aigar Kristovald, Marti Lasn, Jaanus Liivak, Toomas Liivak, Vallo Reinkort, Andrus Renter, Tanel Tein, Veljo Vares, Indrek Visnapuu (Coach: Teet Laur)

2000–01 Tartu Ülikool-Delta

Marek Doronin, Toomas Kandimaa, Tarmo Kikerpill, Aigar Kristovald, Jaanus Liivak, Toomas Liivak, Kuldar Lossmann, Rolandas Mačiulaitis, Ardi Niinepuu, Asko Paade, Rain Peerandi, Heiko Rannula, Vallo Reinkort, Tanel Tein, Veljo Vares, Antti Vasar (Coach: Jüri Neissaar)

2001–02 Kalev

Erik Dorbek, Priit Ilver, Tarmo Juhanson, Tanel Kaljula, Kristjan Kangur, Andres Kilk, Valmo Kriisa, Andrey Laletin, Kristjan Makke, Rauno Pehka, Indrek Rumma, Dan Shanks, Seth Sundberg, Alar Varrak (Coach: Üllar Kerde)

2002–03 Tartu Ülikool/Rock

Vallo Allingu, Marek Doronin, Toomas Kandimaa, Tarmo Kikerpill, Silver Leppik, Toomas Liivak, Asko Paade, Heiko Rannula, Vallo Reinkort, Andrus Renter, Tanel Tein, Antti Vasar, Martin Viiask (Coach: Jüri Neissaar)

2003–04 TTÜ/A. Le Coq

Mindaugas Budzinauskas, Larry Daniels, Gert Dorbek, Kert Kesküla, Karmo Allikas, Petri Virtanen, Andre Pärn, Aivar Kuusmaa, Krzysztof Wilangowski, Ivo Uibukant, Leho Kraav, Rauno Pehka (Coach: Heino Enden)

2004–05 Tartu Ülikool/Rock

Heiko Rannula, Rain Peerandi, Martin Viiask, Kristo Aab, Silver Leppik, Tarmo Kikerpill, Vallo Allingu, Marek Doronin, Asko Paade, Antti Vasar, Augenijus Vaškys, Marko Raamat (Coach: Tõnu Lust)

2005–06 Kalev/Cramo

Turner Battle, Erik Dorbek, Gert Dorbek, Karl-Peeter Dorbek, Víctor González, Tanel Kaljula, Rait Keerles, Sten Möldre, Heiko Niidas, Andre Pärn, Kristo Saage, Reimo Tamm, Veljo Vares, Ardo Ärmpalu (Coach: Aivar Kuusmaa)

2006–07 Kalev/Cramo

James Allen, Gregor Arbet, Erik Dorbek, Tanel Kaljula, Kristjan Kangur, Rait Keerles, Valmo Kriisa, Heiko Niidas, Travis Reed, Tanel Sokk (Coach: Veselin Matić)

2007–08 Kalev/Cramo

Marlon Parmer, Tanel Sokk, Martin Viiask, Valmo Kriisa, Bojan Pelkić, Vladimir Vuksanović, Travis Reed, Rait Keerles, Gregor Arbet, Kristjan Kangur, Kristo Saage (Coach: Veselin Matić)

2008–09 Kalev/Cramo

Gregor Arbet, Nate Fox, Indrek Kajupank, Kristjan Kangur, Rait Keerles, Valmo Kriisa, Tanel Kurbas, John Linehan, Martin Müürsepp, Josh Pace, Rain Raadik, Tanel Sokk, Viljar Veski (Coach: Nenad Vučinić)

2009–10 Tartu Ülikool/Rock

Sten Sokk, Todd Abernethy, Vallo Allingu, Janar Talts, Silver Leppik, Martin Viiask, Timo Eichfuss, Asko Paade, Sven Kaldre, Scott Morrison, Kristjan Kitsing (Coach: Indrek Visnapuu)

2010–11 Tartu Ülikool/Rock

Vallo Allingu, Marek Doronin, Timo Eichfuss, Kristjan Evart, Callistus Eziukwu, Joonas Järveläinen, Tanel Kurbas, Silver Leppik, Asko Paade, Rain Raadik, Sten Sokk, Janar Talts, Giorgi Tsintsadze, Rain Veideman (Coach: Indrek Visnapuu)

2011–12 Tartu Ülikool

Vallo Allingu, Marek Doronin, Timo Eichfuss, Taavi Leok, Tanel Kurbas, Silver Leppik, Asko Paade, Bill Amis, Sten Sokk, Kristo Saage, Rain Veideman, Kristjan Evart, Rain Raadik (Coach: Indrek Visnapuu)

2012–13 Rakvere Tarvas

Mihkel Schleicher, Brandis Raley-Ross, Renato Lindmets, Māris Ļaksa, Kaido Saks, Reimo Tamm, Raimond Tribuntsov, Andri Metsaru, Oliver Metsalu, Juris Umbraško, Kevin Täpp (Coach: Andres Sõber)

2013–14 Tartu Ülikool/Rock

Kent-Kaarel Vene, Gert Dorbek, Valmo Kriisa, Janar Talts, Timo Eichfuss, Saimon Sutt, Marek Doronin, Augustas Pečiukevičius, Kristen Meister, Vilmantas Dilys, Joosep Toome, Tanel Kurbas, Vincent Simpson (Coach: Gert Kullamäe)

2014–15 Tartu Ülikool/Rock

Tanel Sokk, Kent-Kaarel Vene, Gert Dorbek, Valmo Kriisa, Janar Talts, Timo Eichfuss, Saimon Sutt, Marek Doronin, Augustas Pečiukevičius, Kristen Meister, Karolis Petrukonis, Joosep Toome, Tanel Kurbas (Coach: Gert Kullamäe)

2015–16 Kalev/Cramo

Gregor Arbet, Josh Boone, Martin Dorbek, Rolands Freimanis, Silver Jurno, Erik Keedus, Sten Olmre, Brandis Raley-Ross, Sten Sokk, Janar Soo, Rain Veideman (Coach: Alar Varrak)

2016–17 Kalev/Cramo

Gregor Arbet, Martin Dorbek, Aleksandr Gavrilov, Mickell Gladness, Demonte Harper, Silver Jurno, Erik Keedus, Vitali Liutych, Cedric Simmons, Sten Sokk, Matthias Tass, Mark Tollefsen, Rain Veideman (Coach: Alar Varrak)

2020–21 Kalev/Cramo

Devin Thomas, Marcus Keene, Sten Sokk, Tanel Kurbas, Maurice Kemp, Kregor Hermet, Jānis Kaufmanis, Rauno Nurger, Janari Jõesaar, Martin Dorbek, Indrek Sunelik (Coach: Roberts Štelmahers)

2021–22 Tartu Ülikool

Märt Rosenthal, Adomas Drungilas, Edmunds Elksnis, Hendrik Eelmäe, Emmanuel Wembi, Robin Kivi, Kaspar Sepp, Lamonte Bearden, Oliver Suurog, Patrik Saal, Joonas Anton Jürgenstein, Patrik Peemot (Coach: Nikolajs Mazurs)

2021–22 Kalev/Cramo

Taavi Jurkatamm, Alterique Gilbert, Wesley Van Beck, Tanel Kurbas, Artur Konontšuk, Hugo Toom, Kaspar Kitsing, Zigmārs Raimo, Martin Dorbek, Mārtiņš Meiers, Kristjan Kitsing, Oleksandr Kovliar (Coach: Heiko Rannula)

See also
 Korvpalli Meistriliiga

External links
 Official website 

Basketball competitions in Estonia
Basketball cup competitions in Europe
Recurring sporting events established in 1946
1946 establishments in the Soviet Union